Kate Elizabeth Cameron Maberly (born 14 March 1982) is an English actress, director, writer, producer, and musician. She has appeared in film, television, radio and theatre.

Early life
Maberly was born in Reigate, Surrey, England. She is the daughter of a lawyer and one of five children; her older sister Polly is also an actress. She has two older brothers, Thomas and Guy, and one younger brother, Jack. Maberly attended Dunottar School, Reigate where she skipped ahead a year and left with A-levels in maths, chemistry, history and music.

Maberly began swimming competitively at the age of 5 and was a county champion swimmer up to the age of 16. At 7 years old she completed the BT National Swimathon (as the youngest individual to complete the event at the time) which she did to raise money for St Piers Lingfield (Now "Young Epilepsy"), a school to help children with Epilepsy.

She represented her county in tennis from the age of 12, and from 2004-2010 she played for the Royal Parks tennis leagues in London.

Maberly started playing the piano at the age of 6, and at 14 travelled to Venice, Italy, with the Dunottar Chamber Ensemble to perform as the solo pianist, in a performance of Mozart's Piano Concerto no. 23 (K488). She achieved grade 8 in both Piano and Cello in school and went on to study at London's Trinity College of Music graduating in 2004 with a joint honours degree in piano and cello performance. She also composes music and sings jazz and has sung at London jazz venue Pizza on the Park.

Career
Maberly's breakthrough role came in 1993 when she starred as Mary Lennox in the feature film The Secret Garden. Directed by Agnieszka Holland, the film achieved international acclaim and has gone on to become a family classic. This internationally acclaimed performance paved the way for several subsequent lead roles, including; Dinah Bellman in The Langoliers, alongside David Morse and Patricia Wettig, Glumdalclitch in Gulliver's Travels, with Ted Danson, Mary Steenburgen, Peter O'Toole and Kristen Scott Thomas, Ira in Friendship's Field, and Vanessa in Mothertime.

Back in the UK Maberly continued to work on various high caliber period dramas for the BBC, including; the Bafta-winning "Anglo-Saxon-Attitudes" with Kate Winslet and Daniel Craig; the Bafta / Golden Globe-winning "The Last of the Blond Bombshells" with Dame Judi Dench and Ian Holm; the Emmy-winning "Victoria & Albert", the Bafta-winning "Daniel Deronda" directed by Tom Hooper, and the enchanting Hollywood blockbuster "Finding Neverland", with Johnny Depp and Dustin Hoffman. She took to the stage as Juliet in  Shakespeare's "Romeo and Juliet", and then as 'Mathilde' in Christopher Hampton's "Total Eclipse" at the Royal Court Theatre in London, alongside Ben Whishaw and Matthew Macfadyen.

Since graduating, Maberly has appeared in the feature films Like Minds, with Eddie Redmayne and Toni Collette, Popcorn, Rites of Passage, with Christian Slater and Wes Bentley, Standing Up, with Val Kilmer and Rhada Mitchell, The Ghastly Love of Johnny X, and Boogeyman 3. She also starred in the hit HULU/FX show The Booth at the End alongside Xander Berkley.

In addition to her work on screen Maberly has performed voice-overs for Ordynek, Bringing the Pride of Poland to Texas in 2000 and for The Braniff Pages in 2001. She has completed several radio works for BBC Radio 4, including The Dorabella Variation, A Certain Smile, and National Velvet. Maberly's narration of the audiobook Catherine Called Birdy, written by Karen Cushman, received an Audie Award in 1995.

In 2007 Maberly teamed up with a London area music producer to record several of her own songs for a new mini album. Maberly demonstrated her musical abilities by playing the piano in the 1995 BBC drama Mothertime and playing the cello in the 2004 short film The Audition. She also produced and directed a music video for the Danish rock band Blooq a.k.a. Triggerbox.

In 2015, Maberly wrote, directed, and produced a short film, Charlie's Supersonic Glider, which opened the Hollywood Film Festival. With producing partner Doug Liman, Maberly is writing, producing, and directing The Forest of Hands and Teeth, adapted from the best-selling Young Adult series by Carrie Ryan.

Maberly was named one of Variety'''s "10 Brits to Watch in 2017".

Filmography

Film

Television

Theatre
 A reading of Christopher Hampton's Total Eclipse (directed by Daniel Evans) at the Royal Court Theatre (2006)
 Juliet in William Shakespeare's Romeo and Juliet (directed by Richard Twyman) with Midas Touch Theatre Company

Discography

Collaborations

Radio
 The Shoemaker's Daughter The Dora Bella Variation Little Women Walls of Silence National Velvet A Certain Smile My Wounded Heart Peter Pan in Scarlet The Browning VersionOther
 Catherine, Called Birdy (audiobook narrator)
 Braniff International Airways promotion for "The Braniff Pages" – braniffpages.com (commercial voiceover)
 A voiceover for horse documentary The Origins of the Arabian Ordynek, Bringing The Pride of Poland to Texas (commercial voiceover, 2000)

Publications
 Article Factory Magazine (USA) April 2007, Iss. Spring, pg. 54–62, "British Young Guns"
 Pictorial Factory Magazine (USA) April 2007, Iss. Spring, pg. 54–64, "British Young Guns"
 Variety Magazine (USA) February 2017, Iss. Winter "10 Brits to Watch in 2017"

Awards
Maberly has won two professional awards:
 Audie Award for Catherine Called Birdie Special Award from The London Film Critics Circle for The Secret Garden''.

References

External links
 

1982 births
Living people
Audiobook narrators
English child actresses
English film actresses
English women guitarists
English guitarists
English pop pianists
English radio actresses
English women singer-songwriters
English television actresses
English voice actresses
People from Reigate
English Shakespearean actresses
People educated at Dunottar School for Girls
English women pop singers
21st-century English women singers
21st-century English singers
21st-century pianists
21st-century British guitarists
21st-century women guitarists
21st-century women pianists